Johns Creek Mountain, a wildland in the George Washington and Jefferson National Forests of western Virginia, has been recognized by the Wilderness Society as a special place worthy of protection from logging and road construction.  The Wilderness Society has designated the area as a "Mountain Treasure".

Beginning at a knob overlooking New Castle, Virginia, the ridge of Johns Creek Mountain continues southwest for twelve miles undulating between 2900 and 3,000 feet in elevation.  Several trails give access to the area.

The area is part of the Sinking Creek Valley Cluster.

Location and access
The area is located in the Appalachian Mountains of Southwestern Virginia, about 2 miles southwest of New Castle, Virginia.  Cumberland Gap Road, Va 42, is on the southeast side of the area, and Johns Creek Road, Va 658, is on the northwest.  Tub Run Road, Forest Road 257, follows along the northwestern border.
There are no official trails in the area.  The Caldwell Trail is no longer listed in the Forest Service database, however there are many unmaintained trails leading to the ridgeline.

The boundary of the wildland, as determined by the Wilderness Society, is shown in the adjacent map.  Roads in the area can be found on National Geographic Map 788 (Covington, Alleghany Highlands).  A great variety of information, including topographic maps, aerial views, satellite data and weather information, is obtained by selecting the link with the wild land's coordinates  in the upper right of this page.
Beyond maintained trails, old logging roads can be used to explore the area.  The Appalachian Mountains were extensively timbered in the early twentieth century leaving logging roads that are  becoming overgrown but still passable. Old logging roads and railroad grades can be located by consulting the historical topographic maps available from the United States Geological Survey (USGS). The Johns Creek Mountain wild area is covered by USGS topographic maps Looney, Potts Creek and Craig Springs.

Natural history
The area is within the Ridge and Valley Subsection of the Northern Ridge and Valley Section in the Central Appalachian Broadleaf Coniferous Forest-Meadow Province. The ridgeline contains white oak, northern red oak, chestnut oak, basswood and hickory with a quality similar to an old-growth forest.

Topography
The area is dominated by Johns Creek Mountain, a long ridge, about 2900  feet high, forming the southeastern border of the area. 
The area drains into Johns Creek which flows north to join Craig Creek near New Castle. Johns Creek is a calm, smooth running stream until it nears New Castle where it plunges through a  gorge with class 4-5 rapids, presenting a difficult challenge for paddlers.

Forest Service management
The Forest Service has conducted a survey of their lands to determine the potential for wilderness designation. Wilderness designation provides a high degree of protection from development. The areas that were found suitable are referred to as inventoried roadless areas.  Later a Roadless Rule was adopted that limited road construction in these areas.  The rule provides some degree of protection by reducing the negative environmental impact of road construction and thus promoting the conservation of roadless areas.  Johns Creek Mountain was not inventoried in the roadless area review, and therefore not protected from possible road construction and timber sales.

The forest service classifies areas under their management by a recreational opportunity setting that informs visitors of the diverse range of opportunities available in the forest. Much  of the ridgeline has been assigned "Old Growth with Disturbance", the eastern side has  an area  designated "Ruffed Grouse Habitat", the western side has a "Mix of Successional Habitats", there is a  "Scenic Corridor" next to Rt 311  and a small tract  near New Castle, which may be traded for other lands, is designated "Small Tract-Custodial".

A large section of the area has been logged recently, and there is a possibility of future timber sales in the "Ruffed Grouse Habitat" and "Mix of Successional Habitats" areas.  There is a network of 5.66 miles of Forest Service logging road not open for public motor use.

See also
Sinking Creek Valley Cluster

References

Further reading
 Stephenson, Steven L., A Natural History of the Central Appalachians, 2013, West Virginia University Press, West Virginia, .
 Davis, Donald Edward, Where There Are Mountains, An Environmental History of the Southern Appalachians, 2000, University of Georgia Press, Athens, Georgia. .

External links
 George Washington and Jefferson National Forest
 Wilderness Society

George Washington and Jefferson National Forests
Southwest Virginia
Protected areas of the Appalachians
Mountains of Virginia